Bruce James McFee (18 May 1961 – 9 September 2021) was a Scottish National Party (SNP) politician. He was elected as a Member of the Scottish Parliament (MSP) for the West of Scotland region at the 2003 election. McFee served on the Scottish Parliament's Procedures and Justice 1 Committees. He was involved in local campaigns to save Ferguson's shipyard in Port Glasgow and to retain the name of the University of Paisley.

He had previously served as leader of the SNP group on Renfrewshire Council and was re-elected to the council in 2007, representing the Johnstone North, Kilbarchan and Lochwinnoch ward. He did not seek re-election to the Scottish Parliament in 2007 and retired from local government at the 2012 Scottish local elections.

McFee suffered a stroke in March 2019, which saw him enter full-time care thereafter. He died in Paisley, Renfrewshire on 9 September 2021 at the age of 60.

References

External links 
 

1961 births
2021 deaths
Councillors in Renfrewshire
Members of the Scottish Parliament 2003–2007
People from Johnstone
Scottish National Party councillors
Scottish National Party MSPs